This article concerns the period 489 BC – 480 BC.

References